The Geumcheon Interchange (금천 나들목) is an interchange of the Seohaean Expressway and Seobu Urban Expressway in Doksan-dong, Geumcheon-gu, Seoul, Republic of Korea.

Seohaean Expressway's Ending Point (West Seoul) is in up north 400 meters of this Interchange.

Roads

History 
 November 25, 1998: Open to traffic

Around 
 Doksan Station
 Anyangcheon

Seohaean Expressway
Expressway interchanges in South Korea
National Route 1 (South Korea)